Ahmad Pur Lamma is a town in Rahim Yar Khan District, Punjab, Pakistan, located a 13 kilometers from Sadiqabad.

There are many shrines in this town: mohalla mishorian, mohalla malana, mohalla chandiwala, naku chok,  Peer Fazil Shah Bukhari, Mohalla muhammad sarwar Qureshi, Pak Bbiyaan, Basharat Shah Saheed, Dadla Shaheed, Peer Abdul Wahab Shah, Lal Shah, Bakht Faqeer Sain (who was a famous Sufi poet), and many others.

References

Rahim Yar Khan District